Flor María Chalbaud Castro (3 July 1921 – 12 January 2013) was First Lady of Venezuela between 2 December 1952 and 23 January 1958 and one of the founders of the Bolivarian Ladies Society.

Biography
On 4 February 1945, Chalbaud married General Marcos Pérez Jiménez, and was First Lady of Venezuela during his presidency between 2 December 1952 and 23 January 1958. She was first cousin of president Lieutenant Colonel Carlos Delgado Chalbaud. During the presidency of Pérez Jiménez, she was best known in the national media for her role at official diplomatic events in which she presided or took part with the formal name "Doña Flor María Chalbaud Cardona de Pérez Jiménez".

Chalbaud took part in the creation of the Bolivarian Ladies Society, which from then on was customarily led by the Venezuelan first lady. The goal of the organization was to "guarantee by all means possible the assistance of Venezuelan mothers and children, and to dedicate itself to other types of social security." Between 1953 and 1954, the organization began endeavors around the country such as kindergartens, schools, playgrounds and maternal centers. It also delivered toys to children on special days, among other activities.

Chalbaud remained with Pérez Jiménez during his trials on embezzlement charges in the 1960s and his years of exile in Spain, until he died in Alcobendas. She died in January 2013 at the age of 91.

References

1921 births
2013 deaths
First Ladies of Venezuela
People from Caracas